This is a list of Confederate arms manufacturers. The Confederate States of America was a government set up from 1861 to 1865 by thirteen Southern states that had declared their secession from the United States. The Confederate States Army was the army of the Confederate States of America while the Confederacy existed during the American Civil War. Companies appearing in this list were manufacturers of arms within the Confederate States.

Arms manufacturers

Sources

See also
List of weapons in the American Civil War
Rifles in the American Civil War
Field artillery in the American Civil War
Siege artillery in the American Civil War

External links
 Cook & Brother Confederate Armory historical marker

Arms manufacturers

American Civil War-related lists